Marshal Walton Royal Jr. (December 5, 1912 – May 8, 1995) was an American jazz alto saxophonist and clarinetist best known for his work with Count Basie, with whose band he played for nearly twenty years.

Early life and education
Marshal Royal Jr. was born into a musical family in Sapulpa, Oklahoma.

Career
Royal's first professional gig was with Lawrence Brown's band at Danceland in Los Angeles, and he soon had a regular gig at the Apex, working for Curtis Mosby in Mosby's Blue Blowers, a 10-piece band. He then began an eight-year (1931–1939) stint with the Les Hite orchestra at Sebastian's Cotton Club, which was near the MGM studios in Los Angeles. He spent 1940 to 1942 with Lionel Hampton, until the war interrupted his career.

With his brother, Ernie, he served in the U.S. Navy in the 45-piece regimental band that was attached to the Navy's preflight training school for pilots at St. Mary's College in Moraga, California. The band played for bond rallies, regimental reviews, at football games, and in concerts for the cadets and the community. Two swing bands were organized from the larger regimental band, and they played for smokers and dances at USOs and officers clubs. Royal was leader of the Bombardiers, one of those bands, which also included his brother, Ernie, Jackie Kelson (later known as Jackie Kelso), Buddy Collette, Jerome Richardson, and Vernon Alley.

When he left Basie in 1970, Royal settled permanently in Los Angeles, continuing to play and record, working with Bill Berry's big band, Frank Capp and Nat Pierce, Earl Hines, and Duke Ellington. Royal recorded as a soloist with Dave Frishberg in 1977, and with Warren Vache in 1978. He co-led a band with Snooky Young in the 1970s and 1980s, recording with it in 1978.

Marshal died in Culver City, California on May 8, 1995, aged 82.

Discography
 1960: Gordon Jenkins Presents (Everest)
 1978: First Chair (Concord Jazz)
 1978: Snooky and Marshal's Album with Snooky Young
 1980: Royal Blue (Concord Jazz)

As sideman
With Count Basie
 The Count! (Clef, 1952 [1955])
 Basie Jazz (Clef, 1952 [1954])
 Dance Session (Clef, 1953)
 Dance Session Album #2 (Clef, 1954)
 Basie (Clef, 1954)
 Count Basie Swings, Joe Williams Sings (Clef, 1955) with Joe Williams
 April in Paris (Verve, 1956)
 The Greatest!! Count Basie Plays, Joe Williams Sings Standards with Joe Williams
 Metronome All-Stars 1956 (Clef, 1956) with Ella Fitzgerald and Joe Williams
 Hall of Fame (Verve, 1956 [1959])
 Basie in London (Verve, 1956)
 One O'Clock Jump (Verve, 1957) with Joe Williams and Ella Fitzgerald
 Count Basie at Newport (Verve, 1957)
 The Atomic Mr. Basie (Roulette, 1957) aka Basie and E=MC2
 Basie Plays Hefti (Roulette, 1958)
 Sing Along with Basie (Roulette, 1958) - with Joe Williams and Lambert, Hendricks & Ross
 Basie One More Time (Roulette, 1959)
 Breakfast Dance and Barbecue (Roulette, 1959)
 Everyday I Have the Blues (Roulette, 1959) - with Joe Williams
 Dance Along with Basie (Roulette, 1959)
 Not Now, I'll Tell You When (Roulette, 1960)
 The Count Basie Story (Roulette, 1960)
 Kansas City Suite (Roulette, 1960)
 Back with Basie (Roulette, 1962)
 Basie in Sweden (Roulette, 1962)
 On My Way & Shoutin' Again! (Verve, 1962)
 Sinatra - Basie (Reprise Records FS 1008 ,1963)
 This Time by Basie! (Reprise, 1963)
 More Hits of the 50's and 60's (Verve, 1963)
 Pop Goes the Basie (Reprise, 1965)
 Basie Meets Bond (United Artists, 1966)
 Live at the Sands (Before Frank) (Reprise, 1966 [1998])
 Sinatra at the Sands (Reprise, 1966) with Frank Sinatra
 Basie's Beatle Bag (Verve, 1966)
 Broadway Basie's...Way (Command, 1966)
 Hollywood...Basie's Way (Command, 1967)
 Basie's Beat (Verve, 1967)
 Basie's in the Bag (Brunswick, 1967)
 The Happiest Millionaire (Coliseum, 1967)
 Half a Sixpence (Dot, 1967)
 The Board of Directors (Dot, 1967) with The Mills Brothers
 Manufacturers of Soul (Brunswick, 1968) with Jackie Wilson
 The Board of Directors Annual Report (Dot, 1968) with The Mills Brothers
 Basie Straight Ahead (Dot, 1968)
 How About This (Paramount, 1968) with Kay Starr
 Standing Ovation (Dot, 1969)
 Basic Basie (MPS, 1969)
 Basie on the Beatles (Happy Tiger, 1969)
With Kenny BurrellHeritage (AudioSource, 1980)
With Clifford Coulter
 Do It Now! (Impulse!, 1971)
With Coleman HawkinsThe Saxophone Section (World Wide, 1958)
With Monk MontgomeryMonk Montgomery in Africa...Live! (Chisa, 1975)
With Joe Newman Joe Newman with Woodwinds (Roulette, 1958)

Notes

References

Further reading

 Review of Jazz Survivor

External links
Interview of Marshal Royal, Center for Oral History Research, UCLA Library Special Collections, University of California, Los Angeles.
Recorded Telephone Interview of Frank Foster  — alumnus of the Basie band recalls how Marshal Royal would read Jet'' magazine on his stand while he performed

1912 births
1995 deaths
20th-century American musicians
American jazz clarinetists
United States Navy personnel of World War II
Count Basie Orchestra members
Jazz alto saxophonists
Musicians from Los Angeles
20th-century saxophonists
The Capp-Pierce Juggernaut members